Wakefield F.C. was an English football club based in Wakefield, West Yorkshire. The club was previously based in the village of Emley and was known as Emley A.F.C. from 1903 to 2002. The club was wound up in June 2014 and all history and records were returned to Emley A.F.C. in July 2022.

History
Formed in 1903 and began in the village of Emley in the local Huddersfield District League, the club graduated via the West Riding League to the Northern Premier League.
The club enjoyed relative success in the Amateur ranks before the move to Wakefield (see Emley A.F.C.).

After a poor to average couple of seasons in the late 90's and early 00's and with ambitions from the chairman, it emerged that Emley were looking to leave the village. This was due to ground regulation gradings. The League brought in new regulations, concerning three-sided grounds, that meant Emley would be thrown out of the league unless they spent vast amounts upgrading.  The club was unable to expand their ground and were forced to look for a new one. A ground share with Rugby League club Wakefield Trinity Wildcats was suggested, then the club played a couple of games at Wakefield's Belle Vue ground. Although primarily a rugby city, the club moved to Wakefield's Belle Vue for their home games in the 2000–01 season.

Club moves to Wakefield
At their new ground striker Simeon Bambrook scored 30 goals and Danny Day 23 for Emley, during the season. They led the league for much of the season, amassing 100 points but finished second. Emley reached the Sheffield Cup Final, only to lose to Doncaster Rovers 2–1 at Hillsborough and Simeon Bambrook gained an England semi-professional side call-up.

In the following season Emley sustained their challenge for the league, but could only finish fifth.  They again reached the Sheffield Cup Final and again lost to Doncaster Rovers at Hillsborough, this time 3–0.  In the close season the club decided to renamed itself Wakefield & Emley FC.  This alienated some of the village supporters as the club frequently began to be referred to as simply "Wakefield".  2003–04 saw Wakefield & Emley's worst ever season in senior football, they finished bottom of the Northern Premier League Premier Division.  However, Emley remained in the Premier Division due to the re-organisation of the English football league system that saw the creation of the Conference North and South leagues.

The club changed its name once again in the 2004–05 season, this time to Wakefield–Emley. They finished mid-table this time. In the close season Northern Counties East League disbanded its reserve division.  The Wakefield-Emley reserve team had continued in that division when the first team were promoted to the NPL.  They also continued to play at the old Welfare Ground in Emley. After the reserves team, which continued to play in Emley was disbanded, members and supporters of the club from its Emley days formed AFC Emley in 2005 in order to keep football at the Welfare Ground in the village. many fans reverted to following the new club back in Emley, after which, the Emley name and thus, the links to the original club were severed and Wakefield struggled to attract support from the city.

Wakefield–Emley continued at Belle-Vue, but they were relegated to the Northern Premier League First Division.  As there was now a new club in Emley, the board decided to drop the name "Emley" and continued on as Wakefield F.C., the club changed colours and moved to College Grove in Wakefield, becoming fully a Wakefield club.  In 2007, Wakefield played in the inaugural season of the Northern Premier League Division One North.

Paul Lines was appointed the new manager of Wakefield on 9 December 2011 and replaces general manager Mark Brier who was sacked earlier in week. He is joined in the dugout by Liam Sutcliffe as assistant manager.

Wakefield resigned from the Northern Premier League at the end of the 2013–14 season and had planned to participate in the Northern Counties East Football League in the 2014–15 season with a view to returning to The Welfare Ground in Emley, where they were to share with AFC Emley. However the club informed the FA and the Northern Counties League on 21 June 2014 that they would not be competing in the forthcoming season ahead of the club being wound up.

In July 2014 it was announced that the records and honours of Emley would be transferred to Emley A.F.C.

See also
A.F.C. Emley

References

External links

WakefieldFC.com – Official website
 http://www.pitchero.com/clubs/wakefieldfc (Fans Forum)

 
Defunct football clubs in England
Defunct football clubs in West Yorkshire
Association football clubs established in 1903
1903 establishments in England
Sport in Wakefield
Huddersfield and District Association Football League
West Riding County Amateur Football League
Yorkshire Football League
Northern Counties East Football League
Northern Premier League clubs